Why Is Yellow the Middle of the Rainbow? (also known as I Am Furious... Yellow) is a 1994 Filipino collage film edited, shot, co-written, and directed by Kidlat Tahimik.

Summary
It follows the filmmaker and his young son during major events in the Philippines from 1980 to 1994.

Production
It took ten years to make the film.

See also
 List of films with longest production time
 Cinema of the Philippines
 List of Filipino films

References

External links
 Kidlat Tahimik site
 MUBI
 Letterboxd

1994 films
1994 documentary films
Autobiographical documentary films
Collage film
Documentary films about children
Documentary films about education
Documentary films about revolutions
1990s English-language films
Filipino-language films
Films about Filipino families
Films about Native Americans
Films about presidents of the Philippines
Films about travel
Films directed by Kidlat Tahimik
Philippine documentary films
Presidency of Corazon Aquino
Presidency of Ferdinand Marcos